Hans-Jürgen Sundermann (25 January 1940 – 4 October 2022) was a German football manager and player who played as a midfielder.

Playing career 
Sundermann played his youth football with local club 1. FC Mülheim. In 1958 he signed for Rot-Weiß Oberhausen, where he played for four years. He then moved on to Viktoria Köln. After two years with them he signed for Bundesliga side Hertha BSC and appeared in 29 league matches for them. Due to financial irregularities the club was relegated after that season. 1n 1965/66 Hertha won the Regionalliga Berlin but failed in the promotion play-off to the Bundesliga. 

In 1966 Sundermann moved to Switzerland and signed for Servette, where he stayed for two seasons. Sundermann joined FC Basel's first team for their 1968–69 season under head coach Helmut Benthaus. Sundermann played his debut for his new club in the game in the Wankdorf Stadium in Bern on 15 June as Basel played a 1–1 draw against his former club Servette in the first round of the 1968 Cup of the Alps. Basel won their group and advanced to the final, but were defeated by Schalke after extra time. After playing in these six Cup of the Alps matches and five further test games, Sundermann played his domestic league debut for the club in the home game in the St. Jakob Stadium on 17 August. He scored his first goal for the club in the same game as Basel won 4–2 against Biel-Bienne.  At the end of the season Sundermann won the Swiss Championship with the club. 

In the 1969 Cup of the Alps Basel won their group and in the final they beat Bologna 3–1. Sundermann scored Basel's third goal in this final. At the end of the 1969–70 Nationalliga A season Sundermann won the Swiss Championship with the club for the second time. At the end of the 1970–71 Nationalliga A season Basel finished the Championship level on points with Grasshopper Club but were defeated in the play-off final 4–3 after extra time in front of 51,000 spectators in the Wankdorf Stadium in Bern.

Sundermann remained with Basel until the winter break of the 1971–72 Nationalliga A season. During the three and a half years with the club, Sundermann played a total of 175 games for Basel scoring a total of 44 goals. 90 of these games were in the Nationalliga A, 13 in the Swiss Cup, four in the European Cup, two in the UEFA Cup, another 23 in Cup of the Alps and Inter-Cities Fairs Cup and 43 were friendly games. He scored 27 goals in the domestic league, 3 in the domestic cup, 6 in the European games and the other eight were scored during the test games.

Following his time with Basel, Sundermann returned to his former club Servette, where he ended his active career in 1976.

Sundermann won one cap for the West Germany national team in March 1960.

Coaching career 
Among other accomplishments the coach won promotion to the Bundesliga with VfB Leipzig in the 1992–93 2. Bundesliga.

Honours 
FC Basel
Swiss National League A Champion: 1968–69, 1969–70

References

Sources
 Rotblau: Jahrbuch Saison 2017/2018. Publisher: FC Basel Marketing AG. 
 Die ersten 125 Jahre. Publisher: Josef Zindel im Friedrich Reinhardt Verlag, Basel. 
 Verein "Basler Fussballarchiv" Homepage

External links

 
 
 

1940 births
2022 deaths
Sportspeople from Mülheim
German footballers
Footballers from North Rhine-Westphalia
Association football midfielders
Germany international footballers
Bundesliga players
Rot-Weiß Oberhausen players
FC Viktoria Köln players
Hertha BSC players
Servette FC players
FC Basel players
German football managers
Bundesliga managers
Servette FC managers
VfB Stuttgart managers
Stuttgarter Kickers managers
FC Schalke 04 managers
RC Strasbourg Alsace managers
Trabzonspor managers
Hertha BSC managers
Malatyaspor managers
1. FC Lokomotive Leipzig managers
SV Waldhof Mannheim managers
Grasshopper Club Zürich managers
SpVgg Unterhaching managers
AC Sparta Prague managers
CS Sfaxien managers
SK Vorwärts Steyr managers
German expatriate footballers
German expatriate football managers
German expatriate sportspeople in Switzerland
Expatriate footballers in Switzerland
Expatriate football managers in Switzerland
German expatriate sportspeople in France
Expatriate football managers in France
German expatriate sportspeople in Turkey
Expatriate football managers in Turkey
German expatriate sportspeople in the Czech Republic
Expatriate football managers in the Czech Republic
German expatriate sportspeople in Tunisia
Expatriate football managers in Tunisia
German expatriate sportspeople in Austria
Expatriate football managers in Austria